Henry Smithson (born 13 September 1978), best known by his stage name Riton, is an English electronic music DJ and producer from Newcastle upon Tyne.

Early life and education

Smithson was born in Newcastle upon Tyne. The name Riton is French slang for "Henry".

He graduated from the University of Newcastle upon Tyne.

Career
After finishing university, Smithson started the Switch Recordings label, upon which he released his first two 12" singles. He began DJing at Newcastle's "Shindig" nightclub. There, he was discovered by Mark Rae and signed to Grand Central Records independent record label. Like Rae, he then worked in Manchester's Fat City Records label/distribution/retail outlet.

His first release on Grand Central, the song "Communicated", featured on the compilation album Central Heating 2 (2000) and was followed by his mostly instrumental debut album, Beats du Jour (2001).

Riton's second album, Homies And Homos (2004) was a much more vocal affair, and featured amongst others, Lee Jones of Howdi and Luca Santucci. It includes a cover version of The Cure's song "Killing an Arab".

In 2005, Riton and Ben Rymer formed the Gucci Sound System. The pair have a monthly residency at the 333 Club in London and have their own nightclub named Druzzi's Baltimore Rave Club at Nightmoves on Shoreditch High Street in East London. Guests have included Headman, Erol Alkan, 2 Many DJs, The Rapture, Richard X, Mylo and FC Kahuna.

Since the demise of Grand Central Records in 2006, Riton has released 12" singles on several European labels, including Linxfarren in the UK.

In late 2006, it was announced in the Belgian magazine HUMO that David and Stephen Dewaele from Soulwax had formed a krautrock band with Riton called . An album was expected late 2007, but to date there has been no further information on the project. Instead, Riton released an album under the pseudonym  on the label Modular Records in July 2008. In 2010, he launched a project called "" with DJ Mehdi.

Riton was to release new music in November 2011 ('Dark Place' and 'A.C.P) and was also working on music for his album, collaborating with artists and producers such as Surkin and AlunaGeorge due for release in summer 2012.

At the start of 2016, Riton hit chart success with the track "Rinse & Repeat"; the track featured vocals from Kah-Lo. The track was released via Riton's own Riton Time record label.

He then released a collaborative album, Foreign Ororo with Kah-Lo, in October 2018 producing fan-favourite hits including GRAMMY nominated ‘Rinse & Repeat’, ‘Fake ID’, ‘Up & Down’ and ‘Ginger’ - anthems that received a wealth of radio support from tastemakers around the world including the likes of Annie Mac at BBC Radio 1. He also co-produced on the Dua Lipa and Silk City single ‘Electricity’, a smash that went on to win the GRAMMY for ‘Best Dance Recording’ proving his ability to countlessly reinvent himself in an ever-growing crowded market.

In 2021, the MK remix of Nightcrawlers' "Push the Feeling On" was sampled by Riton, to record a track called "Friday". Credited to Riton X Nightcrawlers featuring Mufasa and Hypeman, the record featured a couple of social media stars and was issued by Sony's Ministry of Sound Recordings. It entered the UK Singles Chart at number 60 on 22 January 2021 and eventually reached the top 5 on the Official Chart Company's chart of 5 to 11 March 2021. In November, his Gucci Soundsystem project with Ben Rhymer teamed up with Jarvis Cocker to release the climate change-inspired "Let's Stick Around", which came with a video filmed in Glasgow around the time of the COP26 conference.

Discography

Albums

Extended plays

Singles

As lead artist

As featured artist

Production credits

References

External links 
 
 

Living people
1978 births
20th-century English musicians
21st-century English musicians
Alumni of Newcastle University
Club DJs
Electroclash
English DJs
English electronic musicians
English record producers
Founders
Krautrock
Modular Recordings artists
Musicians from London
Musicians from Manchester
Musicians from Newcastle upon Tyne
Electronic dance music DJs
Because Music artists